Cuddalore is a Lok Sabha (Parliament of India) constituency in Tamil Nadu. Its Tamil Nadu Parliamentary Constituency number is 26 of 39.

Assembly segments
After 2009, Cuddalore Lok Sabha constituency is composed of the following assembly segments:

Before 2009, Cuddalore Lok Sabha constituency was composed of the following assembly segments:
Ulundurpet (SC)
Nellikkuppam
Cuddalore
Panruti
Rishivandinam
Sankarapuram

Members of the Parliament

Election results

General Election 2019

General Election 2014

General Election 2009

See also
 Cuddalore
 List of Constituencies of the Lok Sabha

References

Statistics, Election Commission of India

External links
Cuddalore lok sabha  constituency election 2019 date and schedule

Lok Sabha constituencies in Tamil Nadu